Tabernaemontana antheonycta is a species of plant in the family Apocynaceae occurring in Brunei and Bornean Malaysia.

References

antheonycta
Vulnerable plants
Endemic flora of Borneo
Plants described in 1991
Taxonomy articles created by Polbot